= Browhaus =

Singaporian cosmetics company

- Industry: Beauty
- Founded: 2004 in Singapore, Singapore 2004
- Founder: Cynthia Chua
- Headquarters: Singapore, Singapore
- Area served: 7 countries worldwide
- Products: Browhaus Extend Lash & Brow Growth Serum, Browhaus Brow Resurrection, Browhaus Powertool
- Number of employees: 100
- Website: Official website

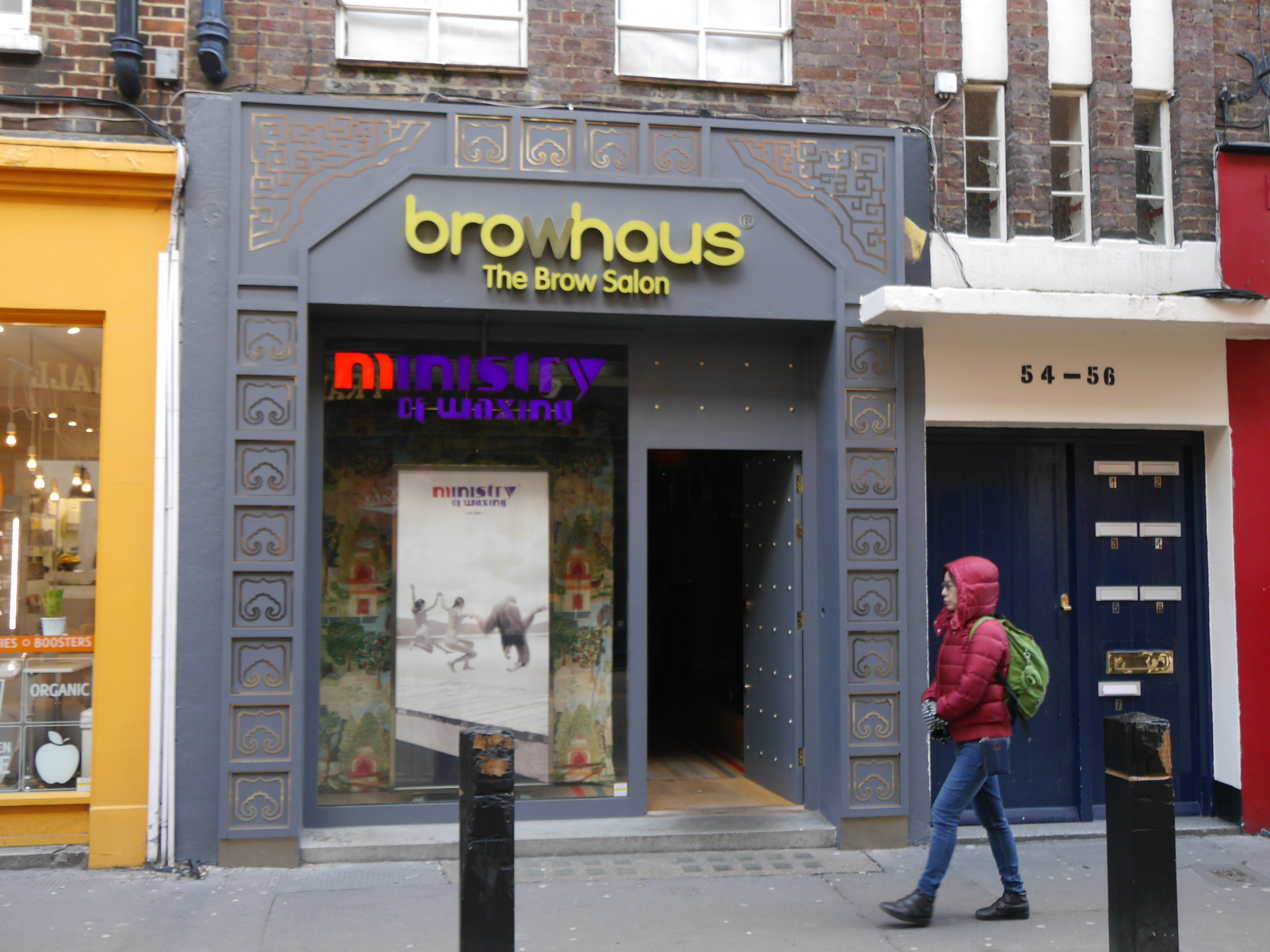
Browhaus, Neal Street, Covent Garden, London

Browhaus is a Singaporean eyebrow and eyelash grooming beauty chain with outlets worldwide.

The name is a play on the German art movement, Bauhaus.

Browhaus was founded in Singapore in 2004, and as of 2022, has 33 eyebrow and eyelash grooming outlets in seven cities: Singapore, Shanghai, Hong Kong, Manila, Davao, Jakarta and Bangkok.

Browhaus offers services like "Brow Resurrection", using tattoo-like brow embroidery to create the illusion of larger eyebrows and "Lash in Bloom" eyelash extensions. Browhaus also produces its own range of beauty products including "Browhaus Extend Lash & Brow Serum".
